Queensgate Shopping Centre (formerly Westfield Queensgate) is a medium sized shopping centre in central Lower Hutt, Wellington, New Zealand. The centre first opened in 1986, and underwent a large scale redevelopment that was completed in August 2006. The centre features over 130 speciality stores.

History and development
The area was formerly a residential area. The houses were demolished in the mid-60s to mid-70s to make way for a transport centre. The centre opened in 1986. The centre refurbished in 1991 and was expanded. It was purchased by Westfield in 1999. Between 2004 and 2006 the mall had a big expansion doubling the size of the centre with a bigger carpark, more shops and a new Event Cinemas multiplex. The Countdown supermarket that is overtaken by the carpark now has now moved south-east of the mall under The Warehouse. The centre has a catchment area of 375,030+ people. The centre has a footfall of over 8 million people per annum.

Thirteen structurally separate buildings make up the centre. Following the 2016 Kaikoura earthquake, the entire shopping centre closed for urgent safety inspections, partially reopening eleven days later. One building in the northeast corner of the mall, containing the Event Cinema and part of the carpark, was deemed structurally unsafe and was demolished. During the deconstruction of the northeast corner, half of the stores remained closed. The mall was completely reopened on 6 April 2017.

In 2017, a car dealer opened a showroom in the mall, complete with cars for a brief period.

Cinema and carpark rebuild
In 2019, rebuilding of the carpark and cinema commenced. On September 17 2019, Event Cinema were confirmed to be the new cinema complex operator. It was also announced that the region's first VMAX movie theatre would open in the site. It is due for completion in December 2022.

Anchor Tenants
Queensgate has three anchor tenants currently, and will have four when Event Cinema reopens in late 2021.

Farmers has a two storey store in the centre of the mall. 

Countdown is on the ground floor of the mall and was rebranded after originally being Woolworths when the mall was redeveloped. 

In October 2017, H&M opened a two storey store, their first in Wellington.

In December 2022, Event Cinemas reopened after being demolished due to the 2016 Kaikoura Earthquake

Transport
The centre is located on the corner of Queens Drive and Bunny Street in the centre of Lower Hutt. It is also the location of a major bus interchange (known as Lower Hutt Queensgate) with buses going to Upper Hutt, Waterloo Interchange, Petone, Wainuiomata and Wellington City. The centre is also a short walking distance from Melling railway station which has rail servies to Wellington City via Petone/Alicetown. The centre has over 1,855 car park spaces.

Culture
The centre is known for the youths often seen frequenting at the southern bus stop. A method used in deterring them is the use of classical music played through loudspeakers.

References

External links
Queensgate Shopping Centre homepage

Shopping centres in New Zealand
Shopping malls established in 1986
Buildings and structures in Lower Hutt
1980s architecture in New Zealand